FC Chibati is a Georgian association football club based in Lanchkhuti, which currently competes in Regionuli Liga, the fifth tier of Georgian league system.

History
Chibati was founded in 1983. They served as a reserve team for Guria and participated in the second division of Georgian championship for several years. 

In 2018, the team was restored on the basis of a local Sport Centre. The next year they took part in Regionuli Liga, where the debutants under Revaz Kukuladze qualified for the Promotion Group. In the second stage of the competition the team finished 9th.  

In the 2020 season, shortened by COVID, Chibati finished in mid-table. In early 2021 the team was faced with an extraordinary case during the opening game. Following the injuries sustained by both goalkeepers, an outfield player had to go in goal. 

In August 2021, former Guria and Bakhmaro manager Temur Loria was appointed as head coach of the team, who was replaced in early next year by Avtandil Nariashvili, also known for his tenure at Guria.

Seasons

Squad
As of May 2022

Stadium
The team plays home games at local stadium named after Тamaz Chakhvadze, one of the founders of the club.

References

External Links
Page on Facebook

Page on Soccerway

Football clubs in Georgia (country)